Jens Stegemann (born November 22, 1971) is a German sprint and marathon canoeist who competed in the late 1980s and early 1990s. He was born in Berlin. In 1989 he was junior world champion at Men's K-4 1000m. At the 1992 Summer Olympics in Barcelona, he was eliminated in the semifinals of the K-1 1000 m event.

References
 

1971 births
Living people
German male canoeists
Olympic canoeists of Germany
Canoeists at the 1992 Summer Olympics
Medalists at the ICF Canoe Marathon World Championships